Lodden is a surname. Notable people with the surname include:

Ebba Lodden (1913–1997), Norwegian civil servant and politician 
Johnny Lodden (born 1985), Norwegian poker player

See also
Lodder
Loden (disambiguation)
Loyden